Gillespie Bros & Co Ltd v Roy Bowles Transport Ltd [1973] 1 QB 400 is an English contract law case, concerning the interpretation of unfair contract terms.

Facts
Rennie Hogg Ltd hired a van and driver from Roy Bowles (the ‘carrier’) on a monthly basis under the Road Haulage Association’s Conditions of Carriage 1967. Clause 3(4) said Rennie Hogg would ‘keep the carrier indemnified against all claims or demands whatsoever by whomsoever made in excess of the liability of the carrier under these conditions’ and clause 12 limited the liability to the value of one consignment. Gillespie Bros had three gold watched transported by Rennie Hogg, but they were stolen at Heathrow, on the way between Switzerland and Jamaica, out the back of the van while the driver was signing for it in the warehouse. Gillespie Bros brought a claim against Roy Bowles.

Browne J awarded £1008 in damages, finding that Roy Bowles employee was negligent. Roy Bowles brought proceedings to be indemnified under clause 3(4) but it was held that the exemption clause could not cover their own negligence.

Judgment
Court of Appeal held that ‘all claims or demands’ and the reference to ‘whatsoever’ should mean that the exemption was applicable between the parties. The clause should be construed as suggested in Canada Steamship, but here the words were wide enough to cover negligence. Lord Denning MR said the following.

Buckley LJ added the following.

Orr LJ concurred.

See also

English contract law

Notes

References

English contract case law
Court of Appeal (England and Wales) cases
1973 in British law
1973 in case law